Eric Abdellah Boudouma (born 24 June 1972 in Morocco) is a Moroccan retired footballer.

Career

Raised in France where he studied law, Boudouma started his senior career with COD Meknès in Morocco, where he was sent by his parents.

After playing for Olympique de Marseille, one of the most successful clubs in France, Boudouma played in Switzerland and Germany, until his father died of hepatitis C aged 67. As a result, Boudouma stopped playing football for six months and chose to restart his life in Italy, where he joined Associazione Dilettantistica Calcio Eclisse CareniPievigina in the fourth division.

From 2001 to 2002, Boudouma played for A.S. Cittadella in the Serie B, the Italian second division, before becoming a coach.

References

External links
 

Living people
Moroccan footballers
Association football midfielders
Association football wingers
Association football forwards
1972 births
FC Luzern players
SR Delémont players
A.S. Cittadella players